Morton Township is a civil township of Mecosta County in the U.S. state of Michigan. The population was 3,597 at the 2000 census.

Communities 
 Canadian Lakes is an unincorporated community in the southwest part of the township.
 The Village of Mecosta is in the northeast part of the township. The Mecosta ZIP code, 49332, serves most of the eastern part of the township.
 Lakeview is located to the south and the Lakeview ZIP code, 48850, serve a small area in the southern part of the township.
 Rodney is located to the north, and the Rodney ZIP code, 49342, serves the northwest corner of the township.
 Stanwood is located to the west, and the Stanwood ZIP code, 49346, serves the southwest portion of the township.

Geography

Demographics
As of the census of 2000, there were 3,597 people, 1,618 households, and 1,216 families residing in the township. The racial makeup of the township was 94.77% White, 1.61% African American, 0.31% Native American, 0.25% Asian, 0.33% from other races, and 2.72% from two or more races. Hispanic or Latino of any race were 1.11% of the population.

There were 1,618 households, out of which 17.3% had children under the age of 18 living with them, 65.9% were married couples living together, 5.9% had a female householder with no husband present, and 24.8% were non-families. 21.6% of all households were made up of individuals, and 11.9% had someone living alone who was 65 years of age or older.  The average household size was 2.22 and the average family size was 2.50.

In the township the population was spread out, with 16.8% under the age of 18, 4.5% from 18 to 24, 16.6% from 25 to 44, 33.0% from 45 to 64, and 29.2% who were 65 years of age or older.  The median age was 54 years. For every 100 females, there were 98.3 males.  For every 100 females age 18 and over, there were 94.8 males.

The median income for a household in the township was $41,422, and the median income for a family was $46,571. Males had a median income of $35,195 versus $25,288 for females. The per capita income for the township was $24,729.  About 6.4% of families and 9.1% of the population were below the poverty line, including 16.8% of those under age 18 and 5.2% of those age 65 or over.

References

Townships in Mecosta County, Michigan
Townships in Michigan